BSFF may stand for:
 Bangladesh Short Film Forum, an organization of young Bangladeshi filmmakers
 Brussels Short Film Festival, an annual film festival in Brussels, Belgium